The 2021–22 season is Dundee United's 113th season. It is their second season back in the Scottish Premiership, having been promoted from the Scottish Championship at the end of the 2019–20 season. The club will also participate in the League Cup and Scottish Cup.

Season summary
United finished their opening season back in the Scottish Premiership in 9th-place. On 25 May 2021, it was reported that manager Micky Mellon had left the club by mutual consent, and Thomas Courts was appointed in June 2021.

Competitions

Results and fixtures

Pre-season and friendlies

Scottish Premiership

Scottish League Cup

Group stage

Knockout round

Scottish Cup

Player statistics

Appearances and goals

|-
|colspan="5"|Players who left the club during the 2021–22 season
|-

|}

League table

League Cup table

Transfers

Players in

Players out

Loans in

Loans out

References

Dundee United F.C. seasons
Dundee United